Jānis Bērziņš (born 9 January 1984) is a Latvian biathlete. He competed in the men's 20 km individual event at the 2006 Winter Olympics.

References

1984 births
Living people
Latvian male biathletes
Olympic biathletes of Latvia
Biathletes at the 2006 Winter Olympics
People from Cēsis